Caridina simoni is a freshwater shrimp found widespread in Sri Lanka and Tamil Nadu, India. The Indian population was originally described as Caridina kunnathurensis by Richard & Chandran in 1994, but was later identified to be the same species. It is found in a diversity of habitats, including both rivers and lakes.

References

Atyidae
Freshwater crustaceans of Asia
Crustaceans described in 1904